Ha-208 was an Imperial Japanese Navy Ha-201-class submarine. Completed and commissioned in August 1945 only eleven days before hostilities ended in World War II, she surrendered in September 1945 and was scuttled in April 1946.

Design and description

At the end of 1944, the Imperial Japanese Navy decided it needed large numbers of high-speed coastal submarines to defend the Japanese Home Islands against an anticipated Allied invasion (named Operation Downfall by the Allies). To meet this requirement, the Ha-201-class submarines were designed as small, fast submarines incorporating many of the same advanced ideas implemented in the German Type XXI and Type XXIII submarines. They were capable of submerged speeds of almost .

The Ha-201 class displaced  surfaced and  submerged. For surface running, the submarines were powered by a single  diesel engine that drove one propeller shaft. When submerged the propeller was driven by a  electric motor. They could reach  on the surface and  submerged. Their armament consisted of two  torpedo tubes with four torpedoes and a single mount for a 7.7-millimeter machine gun.

Construction and commissioning

Ha-208 was laid down on 1 May 1945 by the Sasebo Naval Arsenal at Sasebo, Japan, as Submarine No. 4918. She was renamed Ha-208 and was attached provisionally to the Sasebo Naval District that day. She was launched simultaneously with her sister ship  on 26 May 1945 and was completed and commissioned on 4 August 1945.

Service history

Upon commissioning, Ha-208 was attached formally to the Sasebo Naval District and assigned to Submarine Division 52. She had not yet conducted an operational patrol when hostilities between Japan and the Allies ended on 15 August 1945. She surrendered to the Allies at Sasebo on 2 September 1945.

Disposal
The Japanese struck Ha-208 from the Navy list on 30 November 1945.

Notes

References

 
, History of Pacific War Vol.17 I-Gō Submarines, Gakken (Japan), January 1998, 
Rekishi Gunzō, History of Pacific War Extra, "Perfect guide, The submarines of the Imperial Japanese Forces", Gakken (Japan), March 2005, 
The Maru Special, Japanese Naval Vessels No.43 Japanese Submarines III, Ushio Shobō (Japan), September 1980, Book code 68343-43
The Maru Special, Japanese Naval Vessels No.132 Japanese Submarines I "Revised edition", Ushio Shobō (Japan), February 1988, Book code 68344-36
Ships of the World special issue Vol.37, History of Japanese Submarines, (Japan), August 1993

Ha-201-class submarines
Ships built by Sasebo Naval Arsenal
1945 ships
World War II submarines of Japan
Maritime incidents in 1946
Scuttled vessels
Shipwrecks in the Pacific Ocean
Shipwrecks of Japan